The Supreme Audit Court of Iran (SAC) (Persian: دیوان محاسبات کشور) is a government agency of the Islamic Republic of Iran. Located in Tehran, it is supervised by the Iranian Parliament and dates back to 1906.

Articles 54 and 55 of the Constitution of the Islamic Republic of Iran define the objectives and responsibilities of SAC, the most important duty of the organization being the preparation of the government's Budget Liquidation Report, as specified by article 55 of the Constitution.

The state body is tasked with controlling "financial operations and activities of all ministries, institutions, government companies and other organizations which in any manner whatsoever benefit from the state budget."

Since 2010, SAC has been charged with supervising the Iranian Economic Reform Plan. SAC also monitors the Oil Ministry’s deposits into the state treasury on a monthly basis. It is also in charge of the supervision of the National Development Fund.

"$1 billion missing oil money"

According to SAC's report, illegal payments to some government officials accounted for a large part of the infractions while there were also cases in which the government had acted against the articles of the budget law.

In December 2010, Supreme Audit Court (SAC) Director Abdolreza Rahmani Fazli said that the case was mentioned in a report presented to the Majlis and the report neither called it fraud nor said the money was missing, but only referred to it as "a deficit in the account".

Criticism

According to Freedomhouse "SAC is little more than a ceremonial body because judges appointed by the regular judiciary often overturn its verdicts". They are also not permitted to inspect any of the finances related to the Revolutionary Guards, which is where most of the corruption within the country is believed to originate.

Asked whether Transparency International's recent report on administrative corruption in Iran corresponds to the findings of the Supreme Audit Court, SAC Director Fazli said the report is based on criteria that the SAC does not recognize. "This does not mean that Iran rejects the report and the country should make efforts to fulfill their criteria," he added.

See also
General Inspection Office (Iran)
History of the Islamic Republic of Iran
President Ahmadinejad
Central Bank of Iran
Iranian Economic Reform Plan
Bonyad
Ministry of Intelligence of Iran
Privatization in Iran
Economy of Iran
Islamic Revolutionary Court

Further reading
 Mandates of the Supreme Audit Court of Iran
Country Report "Anticorruption and Transparency" - Iran (2007) - Freedom House
President calls for concord between supervisory and executive organs

External links
Supreme Audit Court - Linked to the Iranian Parliament
General Inspection Office - Linked to the Judiciary of Iran  
Iran Audit Organization - Linked to the Ministry of Economic and Finance Affairs

References

Economy of Iran